Azech SF was a Swedish football club located in Norrköping. The club was named after the town of Azech in modern-day Turkey.

They merged with IK Derik and Assyriska Föreningen i Norrköping to form Assyriska Derik Azech Syrianska, ADAS United, in 2021.

History
Azech SF were affiliated to Östergötlands Fotbollförbund.

Season to season

See also
List of Assyrian-Syriac football teams in Sweden

Footnotes

External links
 Azech SF – Official website
 Azech SF on Facebook
 Syrianska FC official website

Sport in Östergötland County
Association football clubs established in 1980
Association football clubs disestablished in 2021
Assyrian football clubs
Assyrian/Syriac football clubs in Sweden
1980 establishments in Sweden
2021 disestablishments in Sweden
Diaspora sports clubs
Defunct football clubs in Sweden